Caicedo is a surname shared by the following notable people:

Jessica Caicedo (b. 1994), an international boxing competitor
Patricia Caicedo (b. 1969 Colombia), a professional singer and musicologist
Paulo Caicedo (b. 1969), an international cycling competitor

 Paternal family name

Amparo Caicedo (b. 1965 Colombia), an international running competitor
Andrés Caicedo (b. 1951 Colombia d. 1977), a novelist, poet, playwright
 Andrés Caicedo (weightlifter) (b. 1997 Colombia), an international weightlifting competitor
Aurelio Caicedo Ayerbe (b. 1921 Colombia d. 1998), an ambassador
 Beder Caicedo (b. 1992 Ecuador), a professional footballer
 Déiber Caicedo (b. 2000 Colombia), a professional footballer
 Edison Caicedo (b. 1990 Ecuador), a professional footballer
 Felipe Caicedo (b. 1988 Ecuador), a professional footballer
Flavio Caicedo (b. 1988 Ecuador), a professional footballer
 Geovanny Caicedo (b. 1981 Ecuador), a professional footballer
 Jonathan Caicedo (b. 1993 Ecuador), a professional cyclist
 Jonathan Caicedo (footballer) (b. 1996 Ecuador), a professional footballer
José Caicedo (b. 2002 Colombia), a professional footballer
Juan Fernando Caicedo (b. 1989 Colombia), a professional footballer
Juan Caicedo (footballer, born 1996) (b. 1996 Colombia), a professional footballer
 Luis Caicedo (b. 1979 Ecuador), a professional footballer
 Luis Caicedo Medina (b. 1992 Ecuador), a professional footballer
Luis Alberto Caicedo Mosquera (b. 1996 Colombia), a professional footballer
Pavel Caicedo (b. 1977 Ecuador), a professional footballer
 Richard Caicedo (b. 1992 Ecuador), a professional footballer
 Sebastián Caicedo (b. 1981 Colombia), an actor
 Tatiana Caicedo Muñoz (b. 1988 Colombia), a badminton competitor

 Maternal family name

 Álvaro Lloreda Caicedo (b. 1903 Colombia d. 1985), a politician and newspaper executive
Andrés Jiménez (BMX rider) (b. 1986), an international cycling competitor
Cristian Penilla (b. 1991 Ecuador), a professional footballer
Diego Calderón Caicedo (b. 1989 Colombia), a professional footballer
Félix Torres Caicedo (b. 1997 Ecuador), a professional footballer
Jorge Zules Caicedo (b. 1991 Colombia), a professional footballer
José Enrique Angulo (b. 1995 Ecuador), a professional footballer
 Rodrigo Hernán Lloreda Caicedo (b. 1942 Colombia d. 2000), a politician

 both Maternal and Paternal family name

 Carina Caicedo (b. 1987 Ecuador), a professional footballer
 Marcos Caicedo (b. 1991 Ecuador), a professional footballer
 Walberto Caicedo (b. 1992 Ecuador), a professional footballer